Dhanaulti Legislative Assembly constituency is one of the 70 assembly constituencies of  Uttarakhand a northern state of India. Dhanaulti is part of Tehri Garhwal Lok Sabha constituency.

Members of Legislative Assembly
 2002 - Kaul Das (INC)
 2007 - Khajan Das (BJP)
 2012 - Mahaveer Singh (BJP)
 2017 - Pritam Singh Panwar (IND)
 2022 - Pritam Singh Panwar (BJP)

Election results

2022

See also
 Tehri Garhwal (Lok Sabha constituency)

References

External links
  
 
 

Uttarkashi
2002 establishments in Uttarakhand
Assembly constituencies of Uttarakhand
Constituencies established in 2002